is a railway station in Motegi, Tochigi Prefecture, Japan, operated by the Mooka Railway.

Lines
Ten'yaba Station is a station on the Mooka Line, and is located 39.2 rail kilometers from the terminus of the line at Shimodate Station.

Station layout
Ten'yaba Station has one side platform.  There is no station building, but there is a small shelter built onto the platform. The station is unattended.

History
Ten'yaba Station opened on 14 March 1992.

Surrounding area
Japan National Route 123
Japan National Route 294

External links

  Mooka Railway Station information 

Railway stations in Tochigi Prefecture
Railway stations in Japan opened in 1992
Motegi, Tochigi